Ian Shaw (born 2 June 1962) is a Welsh jazz singer, record producer, actor and stand-up comedian.

Shaw was born in St. Asaph, Wales, and took his music degree at the University of London. His career in performance began in the 1980s on the alternative cabaret circuit, alongside such performers as Julian Clary, Rory Bremner, and Jo Brand. At the same time, he was playing in piano bars and at festivals in London and throughout Europe.

In 1990 he toured Europe and recorded with fellow singer Carol Grimes. Since this time, Shaw has regularly worked in duo settings with other singers, including Claire Martin, Linda Lewis, Liane Carroll, and Sarah Jane Morris. By the mid-1990s, he was regularly performing at the Ronnie Scott's Jazz Club and in 1995 released two albums on the club's Jazzhouse label: Ghosthouse and a tribute to Richard Rodgers and Lorenz Hart Taking It to Hart. In 1996, Shaw led his own 'Very Big Band' on a UK tour, and by the late 1990s he was performing regularly in the U.S. In 1999, he released In a New York Minute, the first of two albums on New York's Milestone Records label. This and Soho Stories, released in 2001, featured American musicians, including Cedar Walton, Lew Soloff, and Eric Alexander. On the album A World Still Turning (2003), he worked with Billy Childs and Peter Washington, and guest vocalist Mark Murphy.

Shaw has continued to work regularly with singer Claire Martin, co-hosting the 2004 BBC Jazz Awards with her and appearing with her on the BBC Radio 2 show Big Band Special, a show that he has also presented. Shaw also presented a jazz show on BBC South with Charlie Crocker. He won in the Best Jazz Vocalist category at the BBC Jazz Awards in 2004 and 2007.

A 2006 album on Linn Records saw Shaw paying tribute to songwriter Joni Mitchell. Drawn to All Things: The Songs of Joni Mitchell was followed in 2008 by an autobiographical album, Lifejacket, which showcased his songwriting for the first time. Somewhere Towards Love from 2009 was an intimate album of voice and piano release by Splash Point Records. The title song, written again by Shaw, was chosen by Molly Parkin as one of her Desert Island Discs. In 2011, Splash Point released The Abbey Road Sessions where Shaw is again joined by a band, this time including bass player Peter Ind. Shaw has continued to perform regularly at festivals and jazz clubs in the UK, including regular shows at the Vortex Jazz Club, Ronnie Scott's, 606 Club and the PizzaExpress Jazz Club. International appearances have included Canada, U.S., Dubai, Belarus, France, Italy, and Germany.

As an actor, Shaw performed in Jerry Springer: The Opera in the role of warm-up man/devil, which was created for him by Richard Thomas. In 2005, Shaw appeared as Percy in the film Pierrepoint.

Discography
 Lazy Blue Eyes with Carol Grimes (Offbeat, 1990)
 Ghostsongs with Adrian York (Jazz House, 1992)
 Famous Rainy Day (EFZ, 1995)
 Taking It to Hart (Jazz House, 1996)
 The Echo of a Song (Jazz House, 1997)
 In a New York Minute with Cedar Walton (Milestone, 1999)
 Soho Stories (Milestone, 2001)
 A World Still Turning (441 Records, 2003)
 Drawn to All Things: The Songs of Joni Mitchell (Linn, 2006)
 Lifejacket (Linn, 2008)
 Somewhere Towards Love (Splash Point, 2009)
 The Abbey Road Sessions (Splash Point, 2011)
 A Ghost in Every Bar: The Lyrics of Fran Landesman (Splash Point, 2012)
 The Theory of Joy (Jazz Village, 2016)
 Shine Sister Shine (Jazz Village, 2018)
 What's New (Silent Wish Records, 2020)

References

External links
 Official website
 The Ronnie Scott's Radio Show with Ian Shaw on Jazz FM
 Biography from BBC Wales
 Review of Lifejacket on the free podcast 'Emancipation' on iTunes
 

1962 births
Living people
Alumni of the University of London
British jazz singers
Welsh LGBT singers
British male jazz musicians
People from St Asaph
Welsh comedians
Welsh male singers
Welsh record producers
Welsh singer-songwriters
Welsh songwriters
British male songwriters
British male singer-songwriters